FEM3 is a television channel operated by the TV2 Group that broadcasts in Hungary. It is an entertainment channel, primarily dedicated to talk shows, reality series involving lifestyles, and family life.

It was originally launched on New Year's Day 2010. On 5 September 2016 at 05:00 CET, the old FEM3 was replaced by PRIME, and a new FEM3 started its test broadcasts on a new frequency. Both channels officially launched at 21:00 CET.

Prior to the launch, since 2008, the channel was planned with several names. First, they wanted to bring FEM to Hungary, the name then changed to TV3, as a reincarnation of an entertainment channel which closed down on 21 February 2000. The name was finalized in December 2009.

Programming

Talk Shows
FEM3 Café
Micsoda Nők (Várkonyi Andreával)
JOSHI, A legjobb barát (Joshi the best friend)

Imports

Logos

References

External links
Official website 

Central European Media Enterprises
Television networks in Hungary
Television channels and stations established in 1997
1997 establishments in Hungary